Roberto Alvárez (born 15 January 1960) is a Mexican cross-country skier. He competed at the 1988 Winter Olympics and the 1992 Winter Olympics.

References

External links
 

1960 births
Living people
Mexican male cross-country skiers
Olympic cross-country skiers of Mexico
Cross-country skiers at the 1988 Winter Olympics
Cross-country skiers at the 1992 Winter Olympics
Place of birth missing (living people)